Aliaksandr Piatrovich Liakhovich (born 4 July 1989) is a male Belarusian racewalker. He competed in the 20 kilometres walk event at the 2015 World Championships in Athletics in Beijing, China, but was disqualified. In 2019, he competed in the men's 20 kilometres walk at the 2019 World Athletics Championships held in Doha, Qatar. He finished in 40th place.

See also
 Belarus at the 2015 World Championships in Athletics

References

External links
 
 

Belarusian male racewalkers
Living people
Place of birth missing (living people)
1989 births
World Athletics Championships athletes for Belarus
Athletes (track and field) at the 2016 Summer Olympics
Athletes (track and field) at the 2020 Summer Olympics
Olympic athletes of Belarus
People from Astravyets District
Sportspeople from Grodno Region